AARD may refer to:

AARD code, a segment of code in a beta release of Microsoft Windows 3.1 that would determine whether Windows was running on MS-DOS/PC DOS or third-party DOSes
Angat Afterbay Regulator Dam,  a fixed type river weir without gates upstream from the Bustos Dam
AARD (gene), from List of human protein-coding genes 1

See also
Aard el Borj, a mountain of southern Lebanon
Ter Aard, a village in Assen municipality, Drenthe, the Netherlands